Silla may refer to the following people:

Given name
Silla Bjerrum, Danish restaurateur

Surname
 Agostino Scilla (1629–1700), Italian painter, also known as Silla
Arman-Marshall Silla (born 1994), Belarusian taekwondo athlete
 Felix Silla (1937–2021), Italian stuntman and actor
Titina Silla (1943–1973), Guinea-Bissauan activist
Virginie Besson-Silla (born 1972), French film producer

See also
Scilla (name)
Scylla (disambiguation)
Sillah
Sylla
Priscilla